Bristol County Courthouse may refer to:

Bristol County Courthouse (Rhode Island)
Bristol County Courthouse Complex, Taunton, Massachusetts